Harvey Braban (19 May 1883, in Brighton, Sussex, UK – 1943) was a British stage actor. He also appeared in films between 1920–1938.

Braban performed regularly in West End plays, and also occasionally on Broadway. From 1920 he began appearing in silent films made by the leading British studios Stoll Pictures and the Ideal Film Company. Braban played the Chief Inspector in Alfred Hitchcock's Blackmail (1929) and thereafter often portrayed policemen or other official figures of authority on screen. One of his final roles was that of the Victorian Prime Minister Lord Salisbury in the 1938 film Sixty Glorious Years.

Selected filmography
 The Prey of the Dragon (1921)
 The Yellow Claw (1921) - Gaston Max
 Gwyneth of the Welsh Hills (1921) - Gwylim Rhys
 The Prince and the Beggarmaid (1921) - King Hildred
 Shirley (1922) - Nunnally
 Bentley's Conscience (1922) - Richard Glym
 Man and His Kingdom (1922)
 Diana of the Crossways (1922) - Rodworth
 The Loves of Mary, Queen of Scots (1923) - Ruthven
 The Romany (1923)
 The Great Well (1924)
 A Girl of London (1925)
 Blackmail (1929)
 Alibi (1931) - Insp. Davis
 The Girl in the Night (1931)
 The Callbox Mystery (1932)
 Easy Money (1934)
 The Path of Glory (1934)
 Boomerang (1934)
 Bulldog Jack (1935)
 Keep Your Seats, Please (1936)
 Darby and Joan (1937)
 Thank Evans (1938)
 Sixty Glorious Years (1938)

References

Bibliography
 Duncan, Paul. Alfred Hitchcock: Architect of Anxiety, 1899-1980. Taschen, 2003.

External links

1883 births
1943 deaths
People from Brighton
English male film actors
English male silent film actors
English male stage actors
20th-century English male actors
Date of death missing
Place of death missing